Katkad is a village in Hindaun Block in Karauli district in Rajasthan India. The village is located in the vicinity of the Vindhya Range Many people think that hills around this region are the part of Arawali Range, but these hills are among last tract of Vindhyachal Range. Its population is approximately 10,000. Temperatures in summer range between 25 and 45 degrees Celsius and in winter it is between 5 and 23 degrees Celsius. It has an average elevation of .Distance from village to State capital Jaipur is around 163 km.

The village is dominated by the jagarwad Meena caste and considered to be as old as 1200 years. The village also has a small river named Gambhir, a seasonal river that witnesses water only during rainy seasons.
And In this village  One of famous Temple Trust Shri Balaji Maharaj Katkad Nya Dham katkad(Ghatiyan ka pura)

History 

The village has a rich and long history. Earlier, it was dominated by Gurjar people, but in the 15th century Meenas occupied this village with little intervention of  the Mughal ruler. The village was earlier located very near to the Gambhir River, but 
after staying 1000 years at the same place, they moved slightly away from old place as according to local tradition. Earlier, village was known by as Ratanzila due to its rich agriculture products. Up until the 18th century, when it was banned by the British, opium was cultivated in village.

Temples and fairs 
Being an old village, it has many temples, such as Hanuman ji ka mandir, Dev baba ka mandir, and Naseer Baba ka Mandir Raghunath (thakur baba) ka Mandir. many peoples gathering take place at various occasions like janmashtmi celebration, kushti dangal at naseer baba ka mandir any many others.

People 
Although village is mainly dominated by Jagarwad meenas but all the castes are there and they have fraternity for each other.

Education
The village has several educational institutions including Govt. Senior secondary school(Ratanzila), Baba ramphool secondary school, smarts kids english medium school etc.

References 

Villages in Karauli district